The 33nd Robert Awards ceremony was held on 7 February 2016 in Tivoli Hotel & Congress Centre in Copenhagen, Denmark. Organized by the Danish Film Academy, the awards honored the best in Danish and foreign film of 2015.

Honorees

Best Danish Film 
 Land of Mine – Martin Zandvliet

Best Children's Film 
 The Shamer's Daughter –

Best Director 
 Martin Zandvliet – Land of Mine

Best Screenplay 
 Martin Zandvliet – Land of Mine (Best original screenplay)
 Anders Thomas Jensen – The Shamer's Daughter (Best adapted script)

Best Actor in a Leading Role 
 Ulrich Thomsen – Sommeren '92

Best Actress in a Leading Role 
 Tuva Novotny – Krigen

Best Actor in a Supporting Role 
 Nicolas Bro – Mænd og Høns

Best Actress in a Supporting Role 
 Trine Dyrholm –

Best Production Design 
  – Mænd og Høns

Best Cinematography 
 Camilla Hjelm Knudsen – Land of Mine

Best Costume Design 
  – The Shamer's Daughter

Best Makeup 
 Anne Cathrine Sauerberg, Morten Jacobsen og Thomas Foldberg – Mænd og Høns

Best Editing 
 Molly Malene Stensgaard & Per Sandholt – Land of Mine

Best Sound Design 
 Peter Albrechtsen – The Idealist

Best Score 
  – The Shamer's Daughter

Visual Effects 
 Martin Madsen & Morten Jacobsen – The Shamer's Daughter Best Short Fiction/Animation 
 Mommy – Milad Alami

 Best Long Fiction/Animation 
 Lulu – Caroline Sascha Cogez

 Best Documentary Short 
 Home Sweet Home – Katrine Philp

 Best Documentary Feature 
 The Man Who Saved the World – Peter Anthony

 Best Short Television Series 
  – Niclas Bendixen

 Best Danish Television Series 
 The Legacy – Jesper Christensen

 Best Actress in a Leading Television Role 
 Trine Dyrholm – The Legacy Best Actor in a Leading Television Role 
 Carsten Bjørnlund – The Legacy Best Actress in a Supporting Television Role 
  – The Legacy Best Actor in a Supporting Television Role 
 Jesper Christensen – The Legacy Best American Film 
 Birdman – Alejandro G. Iñárritu

 Best Non-American Film 
 Mommy directed by Xavier Dolan

 The Ib Award 
 Signe Byrge Sørensen

 Audience Award 
 Land of Mine'' – as "Blockbuster Publikumsprisen"

See also 

 2016 Bodil Awards

References

External links 
  
 32nd Robert Awards at IMDb

2016 in Copenhagen
2015 film awards
February 2016 events in Europe
Robert Awards ceremonies